Motueka High School is a coeducational secondary school in Motueka, New Zealand established in 1955.

Notable alumni

Shannon Francois – netball player
David Havili – rugby union player
Risi Pouri-Lane, rugby sevens player
Gillian Wratt – director of the New Zealand Antarctic Programme

References

Educational institutions established in 1883
Secondary schools in New Zealand
Schools in the Tasman District
Motueka
1883 establishments in New Zealand